Oddvar Bull Tuhus (born 14 December 1940) is a Norwegian film director, script writer and television worker. His film debut was Rødblått paradis from 1971. His Maria Marusjka from 1973 was awarded the Norwegian Film Critics' Prize. His film Streik! from 1974, based on a novel by Tor Obrestad, was presented at the Cannes Film Festival. Tuhus was manager for the Norwegian Broadcasting Corporation's department NRK Drama from 1994 to 2000. In his movie Hockey Fever, goaltender Jørn Goldstein has a central role.

Filmography
 Rødblått paradis (1971)
 Maria Marusjka (1973)
 Streik (1975)
 Tillitsmannen (1976)
 Angst (1976)
 1958 (1980)
 50/50 (1982)
 Hockey feber (1983)
 Skal det vere ein dans (1986)
 Blücher (1988)

References

1940 births
Living people
NRK people
Norwegian film directors
Film people from Oslo